Minoru Torihada (鳥肌実 Torihada Minoru) is a male Japanese comedian who claims to come from Sakhalin. His assumed surname, Torihada means "goosebumps" ("tori" meaning "bird" or class Aves, "hada" meaning "skin" or a soft outer covering of a vertebrate). He has an Internet channel called "Torijajiira Hōsō" (トリジャジーラ放送, or Torijazeera Broadcast), a parody of Al Jazeera.

Biography
The central concept of his act is that Torihada claims to be an extreme right-winger and a supporter of imperialism and militarism. According to essayist Mike Rogers writing in 2005, he was "the first Japanese comedian to venture into taboo subjects like the Imperial Family and make a mockery of Imperial Japan."

Filmography

Bibliography
廃人玉砕

Discography
Torism (トリズム) (2004)
鳥肌黙示録 (2001)
鳥肌実 (2001)

References

External links
Official website (in Japanese)

Torihada, Minoru
Living people
Year of birth missing (living people)